Prem Narain Saxena (15 October 1925 – 29 November 1999) was the Founder Professor and Chairman of the Department of Pharmacology, Jawaharlal Nehru Medical College, India. He made several notable contributions to the fields of traditional medicine and neuropharmacology. His demonstration of the wound-healing property of Curcuma longa was a major contributor to India's successful challenge of the US patent on the wound-healing property of Haldi. He was intimately involved in discovery and pre-clinical development of the non-barbiturate hypnotic Methaqualone. His basic studies have helped in understanding the role of various neurotransmitters in thermoregulation. He also standardized the use of Setaria cervi for discovery of new anti-filarial agents.

Biography
Prem Narain Saxena was born on 15 October, 1925, in the village of Bithri-chainpur, Bareilly. It was a joint orthodox family village. He was the first child of his parents, Raghunandan Prasad and Saraswati Devi, and had three sisters. He married Rajeshwari Saxena.

Education
Saxena was schooled initially in his home village but from the age of six or seven he went to Dehradun, where his father worked as an accountant in the Department of Irrigation. Although he suffered from malnutrition and from illnesses such as rickets and typhoid, he was a very brilliant student and came first both in matriculation from AP Mission School and Intermediate from DAV College in Dehradun. In the very first attempt, he qualified medical entrance and did MBBS with 10th position from the King George Medical College, Lucknow (now Chhatrapati Shahuji Maharaj Medical University) in 1947. He did (MD) (Medicine) in 1950 and (MD) (Pharmacology) in 1952 again from the King George Medical College, Lucknow.

He was awarded his PhD from the Patna University in 1963 and his DSc from the Aligarh Muslim University, Aligarh, in 1978.

Career
He joined the Department of Pharmacology of Jawaharlal Nehru Medical College, Aligarh Muslim University, Aligarh, on 14 April 1964 as Professor and Founder Chairman Department of Pharmacology. He served a period as Head Department of Pharmacology till 30 September 1985 and in view of his outstanding merits, he was re-employed by the University for the two years to 30 September 1987. Soon after retirement, he was selected as emeritus scientist of the ICMR, New Delhi, for a period from 1 September 1987, which he served till 14 September 1990. On 31 January 1991, the University appointed him as professor emeritus.

In the university, he had also acted as Dean, Faculty of Medicine, In-charge, Animal House and on few occasions as acting Principal Ajmal Khan Tibbiya College and acting Vice Chancellor of the University. As a Professor Emeritus, he continued his active research in the Department of Pharmacology till late December 1994 but due to illness of his wife (suffering from cancer and ultimately died on 19 March 1996); he did not manage to visit the department regularly and discontinued all his academic services from 1995.

Contribution, awards and achievements
He is nationally and internationally known as a leading neuro-pharmacologist as he worked mostly in the field of neuroscience. He was awarded the Fellowship of Rockefeller Foundation Fellow in USA during 1960–61; Commonwealth Medical Fellowship and then Wellcome Research Fellowship in England during the 1970s. In London at the National Institute for Medical Research, he worked on mechanism of action of Pyrogen and in the field of thermoregulation, with Wilhelm Feldberg (1900–1993), a renowned German-British-Jewish pharmacologist and biologist. Wilhelm Feldberg assisted many research workers who came to England as a part of their Commonwealth Medical Fellowship and Wellcome Research Fellowship. Under these Fellowships, Saxena and Feldberg published many papers during the 1970s.

In total, Saxena has approximately 145 published research papers. He wrote Hospital Formulary in 1969 and a book-cum-manual for practical pharmacy and experimental pharmacology laboratory.

He had been founding member of many academic bodies such Indian Pharmacological Society, Association of Physiologists and Pharmacologists of India, Indian Medical Association, Indian Academy of Neurosciences and Indian Association for the Advancement of Medical Education in India. Indian National Science Academy (INSA) elected him Fellow (FNA) in 1987.

Death and family
Saxena died of a second stroke on 29 November 1999. He was admitted to KK Hospital, Aligarh before death. He was fond of Urdu and Persian poetry and maintained a diary where he used to write his favourite couplets of Urdu poetry. His mother tongue was Urdu.

Saxena had two daughters and one son.

See also
 KC Singhal, student
 Syed Ziaur Rahman, student

Sources

References

20th-century Indian biologists
1925 births
1999 deaths
Indian pharmacologists
People from Aligarh
Aligarh Muslim University alumni
Academic staff of Aligarh Muslim University
Indian medical academics